Ariel's Grotto is a meet-and-greet area at several Disney parks, as well as a former restaurant in Disney California Adventure based on Disney's 1989 animated film The Little Mermaid.

Disneyland 
This was formerly a colorful grotto in which Ariel, in mermaid form, was available for autographs and photo opportunities.  The meet-and-greet area was decorated with starfish, coral, and waterfalls. King Triton's Fountain leading to the grotto featured a soft-surface "sandy beach" play zone dotted with jumping fountains. On August 17, 2008, the area officially closed. It has now been re-themed to Pixie Hollow, a Disney Fairies meet-and-greet attraction amid oversized 'plants' which gives guests the sense of being the size of a fairy.

The King Triton statue that once spouted water into the ponds was moved to the rooftop of Ariel's Undersea Adventure in Disney's California Adventure and is a part of the decor.

Magic Kingdom
In April 2010, the Ariel's Grotto attraction at Magic Kingdom was closed. It reopened as part of the New Fantasyland expansion along with the ride Under the Sea ~ Journey of the Little Mermaid. The similar meet-and-greet sits beside the attraction Under the Sea ~ Journey of the Little Mermaid. It is in a cave, next to Prince Eric's Castle, surrounded by waterfalls and large rock formations. This iteration of the meet-and-greet closed in March 2020 and reopened on January 22, 2023 due to the Coronavirus pandemic.

Disney California Adventure

Ariel's Grotto was an "under the sea" themed restaurant that offered Character Dining. This gave guests an opportunity to dine with Ariel and other Disney Princesses. The restaurant was located on Paradise Pier, and featured American, Healthy Selections, and Vegetarian cuisine. On January 8, 2018, Ariel's Grotto closed to make way for the Lamplight Lounge, a restaurant that opened with Pixar Pier on June 23, 2018.

Tokyo DisneySea
Ariel's Greeting Grotto was a character meet-and-greet attraction. Originally scheduled to close on March 31, 2020, it was early closed on January 31, 2020, in response to the coronavirus outbreak. However, on September 29, 2020, it was "reopened" inside Mermaid Lagoon Theater as a socially distanced greeting with Ariel in her mermaid form.

References

External links
 Magic Kingdom site

Disney California Adventure
Magic Kingdom
Tokyo DisneySea
Fantasyland
Paradise Pier
Mermaid Lagoon (Tokyo DisneySea)
Amusement park attractions introduced in 1996
Amusement park attractions introduced in 2005
Amusement park attractions that closed in 2020
Amusement park attractions that closed in 2008
Works based on The Little Mermaid
Amusement park attractions that closed in 2010
Amusement park attractions introduced in 2012
Former Walt Disney Parks and Resorts attractions
The Little Mermaid (franchise) in amusement parks
1996 establishments in California
2018 disestablishments in California
2008 disestablishments in California
2001 establishments in California
2005 establishments in Japan
2012 establishments in Florida